Vegen Åt Deg (released 28 Nov 2012 by the label Øra Fonogram - OF036) is a solo album by Heidi Skjerve.

Reception 

Here we are served Skjerve's delicate voice on an album where different genres like traditional folk music, Old Norwegian Folk Dance, Danish hymns and American cool jazz mixes and ascend into a higher unity. She challenges both herself and her teachers from the Jazz program at Trondheim Musikkonservatorium, when she gathers her musical roots, creating a highly personal expression anno 2012. Indeed, Skjerve stake out a new course and opportunities for peculiarly Norwegian improvised music.

The review by Tor Hammerø of the Norwegian electronic newspaper Nettavisen awarded the album dice 5.

Track listing 
«Nestekjærleik» (3:27)
«Vegen Åt Deg» (4:43)
«Lær Meg Å Kjenne Dine Veie» (6:57)
«Nysnøen» (2:53)
«Nu Rinner Solen Op Av Østerlide» (4:04)
«Pols Etter Hilmar Alexandersen» (1:35)
«Konstnaren/Den Forunderlige Dansen» (4:50)
«Stå Fast Min Sjel» (4:06)
«Kom Te Mæ» (3:57)
«Gløymsla/Bukkhornslåt» (2:54)
«Hem» (4:09)

Personnel 
Heidi Skjerve - vocals
John Pål Inderberg – barytone saxophone
Vigleik Storaas – piano
Trygve Waldemar Fiske – double bass

Credits 
Recorded and mixed at Øra Studio, October 2012 
Mastered at Redroom Studio

References 

Heidi Skjerve albums
2001 albums